Pegah Gilan Football Club was an Iranian football club based in Rasht, Iran that participated in the Iran Pro League and Azadegan League from 2002 to 2008.

Club history
The club began its life with the name, Esteghlal Rasht. They spent a number of seasons in the lower leagues of Iranian football but made it back to the top level, finishing 10th in the 2000–01 season. The next season proved to be disastrous for the team, they were managed by Nasser Hejazi, but finished 13th in the standings. They were relegated and embarrassingly lost 9–2 to Aboomoslem on the last match day of the season. The following season Pegah Dairy Co. bought the team, making it one of the few privately owned football clubs in Iran. The popular club was named as Pegah Gilan.They won promotion again that season and went back to the IPL. They stayed in the IPL for two seasons but were relegated again in the 2004–05 season. Despite finishing first in Group A standings in the Azadegan league during the 2005–06 season, they were eliminated in the playoff stage and missed out on promotion.

Success Under Nader Dastneshan
Pegah under Nader Dastneshan were able to beat Persepolis, Esteghlal, Saipa in 2007–08 season and even make it to the final game of Hazfi Cup but losing to Esteghlal.

Dissolution of Pegah
In October 2008 Pegah terminated their sports activities due to financial problems. Damash Iranian (Damash Mineral Water Company) owned by Amir Abedini took over their license. The  club was named Damash Gilan.

Season-by-season

Club honors
Hazfi Cup
Runner Up (1): 2007–08

Club managers

Managerial history

 Asghar Sharafi (2002)
 Majid Jahanpour (2002–2004)
 Miodrag Ješić (2004)
 Đorđe Jovanović (2004)
 Asghar Sharafi (2004–2005)
 Bernd Krauss (2005)
 Vinko Begović (2005–2006)
 Majid Jahanpour (2006–2007)
 Darko Dražić (interim) (2007)
 Nader Dastneshan (2007–2008)
 Bijan Zolfagharnasab (2008)

Famous players

 Aref Mohammadvand
 Pejman Nouri
 Sirous Dinmohammadi
 Dariush Yazdani
 Mohammad Reza Mahdavi
 Ebrahim Taghipour
 Afshin Chavoshi
 Iosif Tâlvan
 Saša Ilić
 Saša Radivojević
 Dejan Maksić

External links

Fan sites
  Damash Gilan Fan Site
 Fan Site
 Damash's Forum

Association football clubs established in 2002
Association football clubs disestablished in 2008
Defunct football clubs in Iran
Sport in Gilan Province
2002 establishments in Iran
2008 disestablishments in Iran